Vyacheslav Vladimirovich Sushkin (born 11 March 1991) is a Russian former football forward.

Career
He made his debut in the Russian Second Division for FC Petrotrest Saint Petersburg on 22 April 2012 in a game against FC Sheksna Cherepovets.

References

External links
 
 
 

1991 births
Living people
Russian footballers
Russian expatriate footballers
Russian expatriate sportspeople in Latvia
Russian expatriate sportspeople in Belarus
Russian expatriate sportspeople in Georgia (country)
Russian expatriate sportspeople in Greece
Russian expatriate sportspeople in Uzbekistan
Expatriate footballers in Latvia
Expatriate footballers in Belarus
Expatriate footballers in Georgia (country)
Expatriate footballers in Greece
Expatriate footballers in Uzbekistan
FC Zenit Saint Petersburg players
FC Petrotrest players
FC Dynamo Saint Petersburg players
FC Fakel Voronezh players
FK Jelgava players
FC Vitebsk players
FC Sioni Bolnisi players
Niki Volos F.C. players
FK Neftchi Farg'ona players
Association football forwards
Russian Second League players
Russian First League players
Latvian Higher League players
Erovnuli Liga players
Belarusian Premier League players
Uzbekistan Super League players